Platinum chloride may refer to:

 Platinum(II) chloride
 Platinum(IV) chloride